Kyawywa may refer to several places in Burma:

 Kyawywa, Kale
Kyawywa, Mingin